Agar Aap Chahein is a 1992 Hindi film. It won the prize for best short fiction film at the 1992 National Film Awards.

References

External links
 

1992 films
1990s Hindi-language films